Non-specific effect may refer to:
 Placebo, as placebo treatment in controlled medical trials.
 Non-specific effect of vaccines, as effects from vaccines other than those on the targeted disease.